Hanhart is a Swiss-German watch company that was established by Johann A. Hanhart in Diessenhofen, Switzerland, in 1882. Today, it makes Bicompax chronographs and stopwatches.

History 
On 1 July 1882, the Swiss watchmaker Johann A. Hanhart opened a watch shop in Diessenhofen, in north-eastern Switzerland. In 1902, he relocated his business to Schwenningen, southern Germany. In 1924, Hanhart launched his first stopwatch, and a short time later, the product range was extended to include pocket watches and wristwatches. From 1932 onwards, following the death of his father, Wilhelm Julius Hanhart concentrated on manufacturing raw movements. In 1938, the first single-button chronograph with the "Calibre 40" entered series production, pilot’s chronographs following in 1939. In the following years, Hanhart concentrated on the production of time-measuring instruments.

Today, Hanhart produces its instrument watches and stopwatches in its workshops in Gütenbach, southern Germany. The registered offices of the brand are in Diessenhofen, Switzerland.

References
 La montre oubliée de Steve McQueen rééditée https://www.lefigaro.fr/horlogerie/la-montre-oubliee-de-steve-mcqueen-reeditee-20201107

Hanhart : Réédition du fameux chrono 417 de Steve McQueen 

https://www.montres-de-luxe.com/Hanhart-reedition-du-fameux-chrono-417-de-Steve-McQueen_a16096.html

Further reading
 Schmid, Hans Heinrich: Lexikon der Deutschen Uhrenindustrie 1850 - 1980. Villingen-Schwenningen: Förderkreis Lebendiges Uhrenindustriemuseum e.V., 2005, . (German)

Watch brands